Penthophera morio is a moth species of subfamily Lymantriinae first described by Carl Linnaeus in 1767.

References

External links
 "10408 Penthophera morio (Linnaeus, 1767) - Trauerspinner". Lepiforum e. V. Retrieved April 5, 2020.
 

Lymantriinae
Moths of Europe
Moths described in 1767
Taxa named by Carl Linnaeus